Chambonchard is a commune in the Creuse department in the Nouvelle-Aquitaine region in central France.

Geography

Population

Sights
 The church of St. Martin, dating from the twelfth century.
 The medieval castle of Ligondeix.

See also
Communes of the Creuse department

References

Communes of Creuse